Robert Alan Ezrin  (born March 25, 1949) is a Canadian music producer and keyboardist, best known for his work with Lou Reed, Alice Cooper, Aerosmith, Kiss, Pink Floyd, Deep Purple, Peter Gabriel, Andrea Bocelli and Phish. As of 2010, Ezrin's career in music had spanned four decades and his production work continued into the 21st century, with acts such as Deftones and Thirty Seconds to Mars. Ezrin is the winner of three Juno Awards. In 2011, he was awarded the Special Achievement Award at the 2011 SOCAN Awards held in Toronto. On 29 December 2022, Ezrin was named an Officer of the Order of Canada, the second-highest civilian honour in Canada.

Early life
Ezrin was born in Toronto, Ontario, on March 25, 1949. His family is Jewish. He resided in the Forest Hill area of Toronto.

Music and production career
As of 2014, Ezrin continues to work as a record producer, arranger and songwriter, in addition to being involved with a variety of other projects in digital media, live production, film, television, and theatrical production.

Ezrin has worked on recordings with numerous major artists, including Phish, Alice Cooper, Kiss, Pink Floyd, Balloonatic, Deep Purple, Lou Reed, The Kings, Hanoi Rocks, Taylor Swift, Peter Gabriel, Bonham, K'naan, 2Cellos, Kristin Chenoweth, Rod Stewart, Nine Inch Nails, The Jayhawks, Thirty Seconds to Mars, The Darkness, Jane's Addiction, Dr. John, Nils Lofgren, Berlin, Kansas, Julian Lennon, Joe Bonamassa and Deftones, among many others. Ezrin also recorded the very first demos for Toronto band Max Webster.

Ezrin has been described by Alice Cooper as "our George Martin". Following his first ever production work on an album with Love it to Death in 1971, Ezrin embarked on a long-term collaboration that, by 1973, would see the release of the number one album, Billion Dollar Babies album, a year after the success of School's Out; Cooper subsequently became established as one of the biggest acts in the world. After the disbanding of Cooper's group, Ezrin continued his collaboration with Cooper, as the latter embarked upon a solo career. In 1975, Cooper released the Ezrin-produced album, Welcome To My Nightmare. Ezrin worked with Cooper not just as a producer, but also as a co-writer, arranger, and musician.

Ezrin produced the best-selling KISS album, Destroyer, in 1976. As explained by Peter Criss during an interview in the documentary, KISS: Krazy Killer (1994), Ezrin co-wrote, arranged and performed the piano accompaniment to the song "Beth". Ezrin proceeded to produce two other albums with the band -- Music from "The Elder" and Revenge—and remains close to the band's members in the 21st century.

Ezrin has worked with Pink Floyd on a number of occasions, co-producing the albums, The Wall, A Momentary Lapse of Reason, and The Division Bell. He has also co-written the songs "The Trial", "Signs of Life", "Learning to Fly", and "Take It Back".

Ezrin also produced the 1988 Kansas album In the Spirit of Things, and received a writing credit for the song "Ghosts" and three other songs.

In May 2009, Ezrin co-produced The Clearwater Concert at Madison Square Garden, celebrating the 90th birthday of musician and activist, Pete Seeger. More than 50 guest artists, including Bruce Springsteen, Dave Matthews, John Mellencamp, Ben Harper, Joan Baez, Tom Morello, Ani DiFranco, Emmylou Harris, and Kris Kristofferson performed at the event. Ezrin also co-produced the PBS broadcast of the event.

Since 2010, Ezrin has co-produced Peter Gabriel's album, Scratch My Back; co-produced The House Rules, by Christian Kane; and produced singles for K'naan, the Canadian Tenors, and young pop sensation, Fefe Dobson, for her album, Joy. Ezrin also reunited with Cooper, working on Cooper's Welcome 2 My Nightmare, on the corresponding live show, and numerous other related projects.  He also mixed several projects, including Taylor Swift's Speak Now World Tour Live CD and DVD (2011), and an album by The Darkness (2012).

In 2012, Ezrin remixed the KISS 1976 Double-Platinum album, Destroyer. Also, he produced albums for 2Cellos and rock legends Deep Purple. Bob worked with the band Phish on their 2014 release, Fuego. They reunited for the band's next album, Big Boat, released in 2016. Ezrin worked with Andrea Bocelli on Sì, Bocelli's first #1 album, both in the UK and USA.

Ezrin produced a live and television extravaganza to reopen the Louisiana Superdome in New Orleans, US, starring Green Day and U2. He also worked on an album and live opera with L'Orchestra di Piazza Vittorio in Rome, Italy.

Other ventures

Entrepreneurship
In 1993, Ezrin co-founded a computer software company called 7th Level, which developed and published educational and entertainment CD-ROMs, including a series of Monty Python games.

In 1999, Ezrin cofounded Enigma Digital, an internet radio provider, that was eventually sold to Clear Channel; Ezrin was later appointed vice-chairman of Clear Channel Interactive. Ezrin was also Chairman of Live Nation Artists Recordings in 2007 and the first half of 2008.

Ezrin is also co-founder and vice chairman of Wow Unlimited Media.

In 2009, Ezrin, along with Garth Richardson and Kevin Williams, cofounded the Nimbus School of Recording Arts in Vancouver. Ezrin stated that his goal was to provide new engineers and producers with the hands-on teaching experience that he believed was no longer available from traditional recording studios.

Philanthropy
Ezrin is a board member of the Mr. Holland's Opus Foundation, a national initiative that supports music in US schools by donating musical instruments to under-funded music programs. He is also an Advisory Committee member of MusiCounts, the musical education initiative of the Canadian Academy of Recording Arts and Sciences, that provides instruments to Canadian school music programs.

He is co-founder, with U2's The Edge, of Music Rising, an initiative to preserve the musical culture of the Gulf coast region following the damage caused by the hurricanes and flooding of 2005.

On February 18, 2010, Ezrin helped with the mobilization of the Young Artists for Haiti group. Fifty Canadian artists recorded a rendition of hip hop star K'naan's "Wavin' Flag" for the victims of the Haiti quake. The song was reworked by Ezrin to include specific lyrics for Haiti, with proceeds disseminated to Free the Children, War Child Canada, and World Vision Canada. The production raised over US$2 million. K'naan explained in regard to the initiation of the project: "I got a call from Randy [Lennox, president] at Universal [Music Canada] and Bob Ezrin. They had this idea that they wanted to do something lasting, that actually educates young people in Canada about Haiti and not let the fatigue of the subject wash over everybody and everybody just forget Haiti."

Ezrin is a Chairman Emeritus of the Los Angeles Mentoring Partnership and a past Trustee and Governor of the National Academy of Recording Arts and Sciences (NARAS).

He is also a member of the Board of the Canadian Journalism Foundation, which promotes, celebrates and facilitates excellence in journalism.

As of 2022, Bob is engaged as a Canadian climate activist.

Film and television
In 1982, Ezrin briefly appeared as the host of Enterprise, a City-TV panel show that replaced Dr. Morton Shulman's The Shulman File; he has also been a frequent interviewee for documentary films and television. Ezrin has created new theatrical, television, and live events with RadicalMedia, based in New York, including Jay-Z's feature film, Fade to Black. In 2012, Ezrin appeared in Artifact, a documentary film about the modern music business focused on the legal battle between Thirty Seconds to Mars and record label EMI.

Honour and recognition
Ezrin was inducted into the Canadian Music Hall of Fame in April 2004 and the Canadian Music Industry Hall of Fame in March 2006.

In 2011, Ezrin and Young Artist for Haiti won the Juno Award in Canada for "Single of the Year". Also in 2011, he was awarded an "Outstanding Contribution" at the Classic Rock Magazine Awards.  In 2013, he was honoured with a star on Canada's Walk of Fame in Toronto.

Ezrin was also honoured in 2013 by The Royal Conservatory of Music, being named an Honorary Fellow of The Royal Conservatory.

In late 2022, Ezrin was named an Officer of the Order of Canada, "For his ongoing contributions to music and entertainment production, and for his sustained advocacy of musical education, journalism and environmental justice."

Personal life
Ezrin is married to Janet Ezrin.

Partial discography
2Cellos: In2ition (2013) – producer and mixer
Thirty Seconds to Mars: 30 Seconds to Mars (2002) – producer
Aerosmith: Get Your Wings (1974) – executive producer
Alice Cooper
Love It to Death (1971) – producer, co-writer, and mixer
Killer (1971) – producer, co-writer, and mixer
School's Out (1972) – producer, co-writer, and mixer
Billion Dollar Babies (1973) – producer, co-writer, and mixer
Welcome to My Nightmare (1975) – producer, co-writer, and mixer
Alice Cooper Goes to Hell (1976) – producer, keyboardist, co-writer, and mixer
Lace and Whiskey (1977) – producer, co-writer, and mixer
The Alice Cooper Show (1977) – producer, co-writer, and mixer
DaDa (1983) – producer, co-writer, and mixer
Brutal Planet (2000) – executive producer
Dragontown (2001) – executive producer
Old School box set (2011) – project producer
Welcome 2 My Nightmare (2011) – producer, co-writer, and mixer
Paranormal (2017) – producer, composer, and mixer
Detroit Stories (2021) – producer, composer, and mixer
Army of Anyone: Army of Anyone (2006) – producer and mixer
The Babys: The Babys (1977) – co-producer with Brian Christian and mixer
Balloonatic: My Underworld, Five Cent Beer (2003) - Producer and mixer
Berlin: "Count Three and Pray" (1986) – producer and mixer
Robin Black: Instant Classic (2005) – co-producer with Gggarth and mixer
Andrea Bocelli
Sì (2018) – producer and writer
Bonham: The Disregard of Timekeeping (1989) – producer and mixer
The Canadian Tenors
"Hallelujah" (2010), from the album The Perfect Gift – producer and mixer
"Forever Young" (2012), from the album Lead with Your Heart – producer and mixer
"World Stand Still" - (2012), from the album Lead with Your Heart – vocal producer and mixer
Catherine Wheel: Adam and Eve (1997) – co-producer with Gggarth
Christian Kane: The House Rules (2010) – co-producer with Jimmie Lee Sloas and mixer
Tim Curry: Read My Lips (1978) – producer and mixer
The Darkness: Hot Cakes (2012) – mixer and co-producer on one song ("Every Inch of You")
Deep Purple
Now What?! (2013) – producer, mixer and composer
Infinite (2017) – producer, mixer and composer
Whoosh! (2020) – producer, mixing, percussion, backing vocals
Turning to Crime (2021) – producer, backing vocals, co-lead vocals
Deftones: Saturday Night Wrist (2006) – producer
Dr. John: Hollywood Be Thy Name (1975) – producer and mixer
Escape from Earth: Three Seconds East (2004) – producer and mixer
Fefe Dobson: Joy (2010) – producer and mixer
Flo and Eddie: Flo and Eddie (1973) – producer and mixer
Peter Gabriel
Peter Gabriel (I) (1977) – producer and mixer
"That'll Do" (1998) (title track from the film Babe: Pig in the City) – producer
"My Head Sounds Like That" (2002) (from the album Up) – brass arrangements
Scratch My Back (2010) – co-producer with Peter Gabriel
David Gilmour: About Face (1984) – co-producer with David Gilmour
Hanggai
Horse of Color (2016) - co-producer and mixer
Homeland (2017) - producer
Hanoi Rocks: Two Steps from the Move (1984) – producer and mixer
Héroes del Silencio: Avalancha (1995) – producer
Hollywood Vampires: Hollywood Vampires (2015) - producer and mixer
Steve Hunter: Swept Away (1978) – producer and mixer
Hurricane: Over the Edge (1988) – co-producer with Mike Clink
Jane's Addiction: Strays (2003) – co-producer with Brian Virtue
The Jayhawks: Smile (2000) – producer
K'naan: Alone – single (2013) – co-writer, mixer, and co-producer with will.i.am (The Black Eyed Peas))
Kansas: In the Spirit of Things (1988) – producer and mixer
The Kings
The Kings Are Here (1980) – producer and mixer
Amazon Beach (1981) – producer and mixer
Kiss
Destroyer (1976) – producer and mixer
Music from "The Elder" (1981) – producer and mixer
Revenge (1992) – producer
Destroyer: Resurrected (2012) – producer and mixer
Kristin Chenoweth: Some Lessons Learned (2011) – producer, mixer, and co-writer
Kula Shaker: Peasants, Pigs & Astronauts (1999) – producer
Julian Lennon: Help Yourself (1991) – producer
Lucius: Good Grief (2016) – co-producer with Shawn Everett and Lucius
Murray McLauchlan: Storm Warning (1981) – producer and mixer
Nils Lofgren: Nils (1979) – producer and mixer
Nine Inch Nails: The Fragile (1999) – album sequencing ("I'd never examined what I was actually saying with these 20-something songs," Trent Reznor observed. "Then I realised it could be looked at as two acts. I see Ezrin as he's leaving my studio and I say, 'Bob, you did it, man!' and he says, 'Yeah, I know – I got a flight to catch.' We hugged each other and that was it."
Geoffrey Oryema: Beat the Border (1993) – co-producer with Richard Blair and David Bottrill
Orchestra di Piazza Vittorio: album (2007) – producer and mixer
Phish:
Fuego (2014) – producer, mixer
Big Boat (2016) – producer, mixer
Pink Floyd
The Wall (1979) – co-producer with David Gilmour and Roger Waters
A Momentary Lapse of Reason (1987) co-producer with David Gilmour
The Division Bell (1994) – co-producer with David Gilmour
The Endless River (2014) – bass guitar
Trevor Rabin: Can't Look Away (1989) – producer
Lou Reed: Berlin (1973) – producer and mixer
Johnny Reid
A Christmas Gift To You (2013) - producer and mixer
A Christmas Gift To You Platinum Edition (2014) - producer and mixer
Revival (2017) - co-producer, composer and mixer
What Love Is All About (2015) - producer and mixer
Rod Stewart: Every Beat of My Heart (1986) – producer
Soundtrack
Babe: Pig in the City – Music from and Inspired by the Motion Picture (1998)
Heavy Metal 2000 (1999)
Taylor Swift: Speak Now World Tour Live (2011) – mixer for both the CD and DVD
Téléphone: Dure Limite (1982) – producer and mixer
The Tenors: "Who Wants to Live Forever" from Under One Sky (2015) - producer, arranger and mixer
The Tenors feat. Johnny Reid: "God Rest Ye Merry Gentlemen" (2017) - producer and mixer
The Throbs: The Language of Thieves and Vagabonds (1991) – co-producer with Richard Wagner and Brian Christian
U2: U2 at the BBC (2017) – producer
U2 and Green Day: live recording of "The Saints Are Coming" (2006)
Ursa Major: [Ursa Major] (1972) – producer and mixer
Villebillies: "Greatest Moment" single (2006) – producer and mixer
Vow Wow: Mountain Top (1990) – co-producer with Brian Christian, mixer, and co-writer
Dick Wagner: Richard Wagner (1978) – producer and mixer
Young Artists for Haiti: "Wavin' Flag" single (2010) – producer

See also

Album era
Music of Canada
Canadian Music Hall of Fame

References

External links

 
 Bob Ezrin at Aol Music.
 Bob Ezrin at Tonic
 "Thank God For Trent Reznor" on Torontoist, April 19, 2007
 MusiCounts charity
 Nimbus School of Recording Arts

1949 births
Living people
Canadian Jews
Canadian record producers
Canadian Music Hall of Fame inductees
Musicians from Toronto
Kiss (band) personnel
Officers of the Order of Canada
Jack Richardson Producer of the Year Award winners